Serious Moonlight is a 2009 American black comedy film directed by Cheryl Hines and starring Meg Ryan, Timothy Hutton, Kristen Bell, and Justin Long. It was released by Magnolia Pictures on 4 December 2009.

Plot
When Louise, a high-powered Chicago attorney (Meg Ryan), discovers that her husband Ian (Timothy Hutton) is about to leave her for another woman named Sara (Kristen Bell), she prevents him from doing so by binding him to a chair with duct tape. She tries to persuade and convince him that he still loves her, but everything she says fails to change his mind. He lies and promises that he still loves her and won't run away when she frees him. When he tries to escape, she knocks him out with a flower pot and tapes him to a toilet. She then leaves the house to purchase groceries to make a "romantic meal." While she is out, a lawn service boy comes by to mow the lawn, and Ian successfully yells for help and gets his attention. The boy, realizing that there is no one else in the house, begins robbing their house. When Louise returns, the burglar attacks her and brings her into the bathroom with Ian. During their captivity, Ian realizes that he does still love his wife, and the couple makes up. The next morning, Sara (Ian's mistress) comes to the house, furious that Ian did not show up at the airport to go to Paris with her. The burglars put Sara into the bathroom with the reconciled couple, and the three discuss their love triangle situation. They manage to escape by calling the police from Sara's cell phone, which is in her back pocket. After the whole ordeal, Ian chooses to stay with Louise.

Some time later, Ian and Louise have sold their house and are moving away. They have had a baby as they had tried to in the past. They decide to have lunch one last time in town before they move. While walking to the restaurant, they walk past the same burglar who robbed their house, and the burglar nods at them in recognition. Louise looks away and walks away quickly, and Ian looks stunned (implying she organized the burglary).

Cast
 Meg Ryan as Louise
 Timothy Hutton as Ian
 Kristen Bell as Sara
 Justin Long as Todd

Production
In 2006, a year prior to filming, the screenplay's writer, Adrienne Shelly, was murdered in New York City. Her widower, Andy Ostroy, acted as a producer for the film. The film marks the feature directorial debut of Cheryl Hines, Shelly's Waitress co-star. "I feel a great sense of pride to be directing this film," Hines said. "I had such respect for Adrienne and the work she did. And I love her writing so much. That tone is really in my wheelhouse."

Release
The film premiered at the Tribeca Film Festival in April 2009.

On 28 July, Magnolia Pictures revealed that they had acquired the North American rights to the film. It was released via Magnolia's Ultra VOD programme, providing a platform of 50 million households. This was followed by a December 4, 2009 theatrical release.

Myriad Pictures distributes the film outside of North America.

Reception
The film has received a negative critical reaction. On Rotten Tomatoes the film has a score of 22% based on reviews from 26 critics. On Metacritic it has a score of 36% based on review from 16 critics, indicating "Generally unfavorable reviews".

Of those who praised the film, The Hollywood Reporter said: "'Moonlight' has its serious side as an intelligent peephole into the psychological and sexual dynamics that can drive a once loving, loyal couple to the edge of criminality." They also praised Ryan's "terrific" performance and concluded that the film is "a nuttily engaging tale of betrayal and, perhaps, redemption." The Los Angeles Times considered it "one of the pleasures of the film -- from conception to character to the conversations that fill the scenes -- is the savvy and off-center way Shelly had of crafting troubled relationships. Thankfully, Waitress co-star Cheryl Hines has not lost sight of that in making her feature directing debut."

Most critics agreed with Mick LaSalle of the San Francisco Chronicle, who believed the film to be "a tonal disaster, distasteful and sentimental by turns. It was probably a mistake to have Hines try to walk that same delicate line that took Shelly her entire career to master." The New York Post thought it "foul" and "a shrill farce that strains credibility even by the standards of black comedy", with "a problematic script by murdered filmmaker Adrienne Shelley ("Waitress"), which never should have seen the light of day". The Village Voice found the film's "backstory much more intriguingly dramatic than what's onscreen".

References

External links
 

2009 films
2009 black comedy films
2009 independent films
American black comedy films
American independent films
Films about couples
Home invasions in film
2009 directorial debut films
2009 comedy films
2000s English-language films
2000s American films